Women in Palau, known also as Palauan women, Belauan women, Pelew (archaic English) women, or Women of Los Palaos Islands (Spanish influenced name) are women who live in or are from Palau. Historically, there was a strong "gendered division of labor" between women and men of Palau.

Historical context 
To women belonged activities like farming and collection of shellfish (men were in charge of house construction and community building). Present-day women - among Palauan men - are participants to wage labor. Although women now occupy jobs as physicians, lawyers and business managers. In relation to the history of national politics of Palau, Sandra Pierantozzi became the Vice President of Palau, and is now serving as Palau's Foreign Minister. There is already the first Palauan woman serving on the Supreme Court of Palau.

Traditionally, a Senior Palauan woman can become a part of the village council leadership, who has powers to select and remove male titleholders. They have decision-making authority in terms of matriline-controlled property and wealth (money are received by women on behalf of clans).

Food production 
Starch foods, known as ongraol are produced by women who work the taro swamps in the villages. Food beliefs include preparing special foods for pregnant and lactating Palauan women.

Social stratification symbols 
As a sign of personal achievement, women in Palau may wear necklaces that are made up of Palauan money pieces.

Dance 
The usual form of dance Palauan women perform include traditional dance that are "stately and performed by two lines of women".

Notable women 

 Siobhon McManus, activist
 Sandra Pierantozzi, former Vice-President
 Valeria Toribiong, former First Lady
 Maria Gates-Meltel, former governor of Angaur state

References

External links 

 
Micronesian people